The Lion Red Cup  was a New Zealand domestic rugby league competition that ran from 1994 to 1996 sponsored by brewers Lion Nathan. It was created due to the increase in public awareness of domestic rugby league due to the Auckland Warriors being accepted into the Winfield Cup. The competition was a huge success in its inaugural year, although it made a massive loss financially. Throughout its three-year history it continued to make a loss, eventually being scrapped by the New Zealand Rugby League.

Teams
The teams that participated were:

Seasons

Leading Scorers

References

External links
Zealand Competitions The Vault

Rugby league competitions in New Zealand